The cranium (plural crania) is a part of the skull.

Crania or cranium may also refer to:

Art, entertainment, and media

Games
 Cranium (board game), a board game, or its extensions or spin-offs
 Cranium, Inc., the board game company that makes Cranium

Music
 Cranium (band), a Swedish speed metal band

Film
 Cranium Entertainment, an American film production company

Biology
 Crania (brachiopod), a genus of brachiopods

Places
Any one of a number of places in Greece, known in modern transliteration as Kranea or more traditionally as Crania (Greek: Κρανέα):
Kranea (disambiguation)

See also
 Skull (disambiguation)